Packera tomentosa is a species of flowering plant in the composite family known by the common name woolly ragwort. It is native to the Southeastern United States, primarily to the coastal plain but extending into some areas inland. Its preferred habitat is open, sandy areas and granitic outcrops. It is common throughout its range.

Packera tomentosa is a perennial that produces a head of yellow flowers in late spring. Its seeds have been shown to have varying masses within a single head of flowers, perhaps as an adaptation for better dispersal in disturbed habitats.

References

tomentosa
Flora of the Southeastern United States
Flora without expected TNC conservation status